Arnait Video Productions (Women's Video Workshop of Igloolik) is a women's filmmaking collective that aims to value the voices of Inuit women in debates of interest to all Canadians. Arnait is related to Isuma Productions.

History
Arnait was founded in 1991 by Marie-Hélène Cousineau, Madeline Ivalu, Susan Avingaq, Carol Kunuk and Atuat Akkitirq. It was originally named Arnait Ikajurtigiit (Inuktitut: Women helping each other), and focuses on documenting women's experience and community in Nunavut.

Susan Avingaq describes Arnait as: "a women's video workshop [that] can help people communicate with each other. That can be useful. It can make them understand. A long time ago, just with words and language, people believed stories and legends, they saw pictures in their imagination. Our stories are useful and unforgettable".

Productions
As with Isuma, Arnait's work spans interviews, short ethnographic videos on traditional activities, television series, feature documentaries and narrative feature films. Their first narrative feature Before Tomorrow (Le Jour avant le lendemain) was adapted by Danish writer Jørn Riel from the novel For morgendagen. It premiered in Igloolik in 2008 in front of the community involved in its making. It received nine Canadian Genie Award nominations, including Best Picture, Best Director, Best Actress, Best Actor, Adapted Screenplay, Art Direction, Costumes, Sound, Original Song, and four Jutra Awards: Best Picture, Director, Costumes, Music.

Uvanga premiered at the Festival du Nouveau Cinéma in September 2013, toured internationally to film festivals including the Berlinale, and had a theatrical release in Canada in summer 2014.

In 2014, Arnait started production on Sol, a documentary prompted by the supposed suicide of 26-year-old musician Solomon Uyarasuk in a Royal Canadian Mounted Police jail cell. The film subsequently won the Grand Prize for Best Canadian Feature at the RIDM Montreal International Documentary Festival and was included in the list of Canada's Top Ten feature films of 2014, selected by a panel of filmmakers and industry professionals organized by TIFF.

Short works
Ningiura (Grandmother)
Qulliq
Attagutaaluk Starvation
Piujuq
Angutautaq

Features
Anaana (Mother)
Unakuluk (Dear Little One)
Before Tomorrow (Le Jour avant le lendemain), 2008
Uvanga, 2013
Sol, 2014
Restless River, 2019

References

Feminist filmmakers
Inuit organizations
Film production companies of Canada
Inuit film
Indigenous film and television production companies in Canada
Indigenous broadcasting in Canada
Organizations based in Nunavut
Women's film organizations
Film collectives
Women's collectives
Canadian companies established in 1991
Women in Nunavut